Martin Lee Dapper (born 5 July 1968) is a British auto racing driver and businessman. He previously competed in the British Touring Car Championship.

Depper was the 2008 Mini Challenge UK Champion with Forster Motorsport. In 2013, he competed in the VW Cup, racing for KPM.

Racing career
Born in Kings Norton, West Midlands, Depper first started competitive racing in 2005, initially in the Mini Challenge Cooper Class. After finishing third in Club Class in his second season, he finished third outright in the Senior Class in 2007 for Forster Motorsport, and won the drivers title outright in 2008. In 2009, he finished in fourth place overall with three race wins.

In 2010, Forster Motorsport stepped up to the British Touring Car Championship, entering two BMW 320si cars to be driven by Depper alongside Arthur Forster.

In 2013, he competed in the VW Cup, racing for KPM. In 2014, Depper returned to the BTCC with Eurotech Racing, driving a Honda Civic alongside Andrew Jordan, achieving a best finish of 12th in two rounds. In 2015, Depper continued with Eurotech, achieving a best result of 9th and 18th in the championship.

2016 saw him remain with Eurotech in the British Touring Car Championship, driving the new Type R Honda Civic, achieving a career best finish of 5th at Thruxton.  In 2017, he moved to Motorbase Performance, driving a Ford Focus ST teammates with Mat Jackson and Rory Butcher. Depper secured fastest lap at Brands in the last race of the year. It was announced upon the unveiling of entrants for the 2018 season that Depper would not be returning to the BTCC. He is currently competing in the  VW Cup with Maximum Motorsport.

Business career
Depper is a director of several businesses, primarily in the appliance parts industry, which were founded by his father, Michael Depper.

Racing record

Complete British Touring Car Championship results
(key) (Races in bold indicate pole position – 1 point awarded just in first race; races in italics indicate fastest lap – 1 point awarded all races; * signifies that driver lead race for at least one lap – 1 point awarded all races)

References

External links
Official site
BTCC official site

Living people
English racing drivers
1968 births
British Touring Car Championship drivers
20th-century English businesspeople
21st-century English businesspeople
Mini Challenge UK drivers